The Amphibia are a class of animals.

Amphibia may also refer to:
 Amphibia (TV series), a 2019 American animated series
 Amphibia (album), a 1996 Patrick Rondat album
 Amphibia (taxon), several taxa known as "amphibia"

See also

Amfibia, a Soviet diving watch
Anfibia, an Argentine magazine
 
Amphibian (disambiguation)
Amphibious (disambiguation)